"Whatcha Gonna Do Now" is a song written and performed by Tommy Collins and released on the Capitol label (catalog no. 2891). In September 1954, it peaked at No. 4 on the Billboard country and western charts and spent a total of 21 weeks on the charts. It was also ranked No. 28 on Billboards 1954 year-end country and western retail chart.

See also
 Billboard Top Country & Western Records of 1954

References

American country music songs
1954 songs